Julia Verlyn LaMarsh,  (December 20, 1924 – October 27, 1980) was a Canadian politician, lawyer, author and broadcaster. In 1963, she was only the second woman to ever serve as a federal Cabinet Minister. Under Prime Minister Lester Pearson's minority governments of the middle and late 1960s, she helped push through the legislation that created the Canada Pension Plan and Medicare. As Secretary of State, she was in charge of Canada's Centennial celebrations in 1967. After leaving politics in 1968, she wrote three books, and had her own radio show on CBC Radio. She was stricken with pancreatic cancer in 1979 and was given the Order of Canada at her hospital bed.  She died a few days short of the 20th anniversary of her first political election victory, in 1980.

Early life 

Of French and English descent, LaMarsh was born in Chatham, Ontario, and raised in Niagara Falls. Although she trained as a teacher, she never taught school. In High School, Judy was a member of Alpha Chapter, Theta Kappa Sigma Sorority in Niagara Falls. During World War II, she enlisted in the Canadian Women's Army Corps, travelled the country from 1943 to 1946, and attained the rank of sergeant. LaMarsh worked with the Corps of Royal Canadian Engineers in Halifax and then, after studying Japanese in Vancouver, served as a Japanese translator in Intelligence with Japanese-Canadian soldiers.

After the war, she attended the University of Toronto's Victoria College, and Osgoode Hall, where she was trained as a lawyer, graduating in 1950. She was called to the Bar of Ontario, and joined her father's law practice in Niagara Falls.

Political career
After unsuccessful forays into Ontario provincial politics, LaMarsh was first elected to the House of Commons of Canada in a 1960 by-election. Sitting as a Liberal Member of Parliament (MP) for Niagara Falls, she joined the Canadian Cabinet after the Liberals defeated the Progressive Conservative government of John Diefenbaker in the 1963 election. Serving under Prime Minister Lester Pearson, she was the second female federal cabinet minister in Canadian history, and the first to serve in a Liberal cabinet. LaMarsh served as Minister of National Health and Welfare and Minister of Amateur Sport from 1963 to 1965, and as Secretary of State for Canada from 1965 to 1968.

Her period as Minister of National Health and Welfare coincided with the introduction of the Canada Pension Plan and the drafting of what was to become Canada's Medicare system. Besides shepherding the Medicare bill through parliament, she also became the first major western-world government official to oppose tobacco smoking publicly. On June 17, 1963, she rose to speak on the floor of the House of Commons and declared: "There is scientific evidence that cigarette smoking is a contributory cause of lung cancer and that it may also be associated with chronic bronchitis and coronary heart disease."  As Secretary of State, she presided over the Canadian Centennial celebrations in 1967, presented the Broadcasting Act of 1968 to Parliament, and served on the Royal Commission on the Status of Women.

In the 1968 Liberal leadership convention to choose a successor to Pearson, she supported Paul Hellyer. When it became clear after the first round of voting that Hellyer could not win, she urged him to drop off the ballot and throw his support to another candidate in order to stop Pierre Trudeau. Her words, uttered on the floor of the convention hall: "Paul, you've got to go to [Robert] Winters. Don't let that bastard win it, Paul – he isn't even a Liberal" were, unbeknownst to her, broadcast live over CBC Television. She retired from politics after Trudeau won the party's leadership.

Post-political career
After politics, she returned to her work as a lawyer. She often took on civil rights cases, including the defense of the Brunswick Four in a prominent LGBT rights case in 1974.

She published her political autobiography, entitled Memoirs of a Bird in a Gilded Cage, in 1969, and the book sold very well. LaMarsh worked as a broadcaster including a part-time job with CBC Radio, hosting This Country in the Morning in 1974. From fall 1975 to spring 1976, she hosted her own show called Judy. It was broadcast weekdays from 9:00 a.m. to 12:00 noon, nationally.

In April 1975, Ontario Premier William Davis chose her to head the Ontario government's Royal Commission on Violence in the Communications Industry. It spent two years coming up with 68 recommendations, many highly controversial ones like an omnibus government agency controlling all television content, and newspapers to be governed by a national council on ethics, that would police the industry for violations. Civil liberty groups criticized the media recommendations as violations on free speech and freedom of the press grounds.

Later life and death
In 1979, she decided to go back into law, and opened a family law practice. In December 1979, LaMarsh was rushed to Sunnybrook Medical Centre where she was diagnosed with inoperable pancreatic cancer. While receiving treatment for her cancer at Toronto's Princess Margaret Hospital, Governor General Edward Schreyer invested her as an Officer of the Order of Canada, at her hospital bed on July 22, 1980. A few months later, just days away from the 20th anniversary of her first federal political victory, she died on October 27, 1980, aged 55.

Her funeral was held in Niagara Falls on October 29, 1980. She had six female pallbearers including: Edith Druggan and Florence Rosberg, of Niagara Falls, broadcaster Barbara Frum, British Columbia Judge Nancy Morrison, lawyer Pamela Verill Walker, and Doris Anderson, president of the Canadian Advisory Council on the Status of Women. It was a short service, attended by 300 friends and dignitaries including Ontario's premier William Davis, former Ontario Lieutenant-Governor Pauline McGibbon, and several federal politicians including the man she backed for federal Liberal leader in 1968, Paul Hellyer. She was laid to rest next to her parents, at a graveyard that bordered the historic Canadian battleground, Lundy's Lane.

Archives 
There is a Judy LaMarsh fonds at Library and Archives Canada.

References

Bibliography

External links

 

1924 births
1980 deaths
Lawyers in Ontario
Canadian memoirists
Canadian Ministers of Health and Welfare
Canadian Presbyterians
Canadian talk radio hosts
Women government ministers of Canada
Canadian women lawyers
Women members of the House of Commons of Canada
Canadian women novelists
CBC Radio hosts
Deaths from cancer in Ontario
Liberal Party of Canada MPs
Members of the House of Commons of Canada from Ontario
Members of the King's Privy Council for Canada
Officers of the Order of Canada
Osgoode Hall Law School alumni
People from Chatham-Kent
People from Niagara Falls, Ontario
University of Toronto alumni
Women in Ontario politics
Canadian women memoirists
Writers from Ontario
20th-century Canadian women politicians
20th-century Canadian women writers
20th-century Canadian lawyers
20th-century Canadian novelists
Canadian women radio hosts
20th-century women lawyers
20th-century memoirists
Canadian Screen Award winning journalists